e.solutions is a company developing automotive infotainment systems and digital dashboards. It is a joint venture between CARIAD, the automotive software subsidiary in the Volkswagen Group, and Elektrobit, owned by Continental AG. Audi's 'Virtual Cockpit' instrument cluster is developed by e.solutions. The company is headquartered in Ingolstadt with another office in Erlangen, both in Germany.

Products are used by all passenger vehicle brands of the Volkswagen Group (i.e. Audi, Porsche, Bentley, Volkswagen, SEAT, Škoda).

References

Software companies of Germany